Jameh Mosque of Qeshm in Qeshm and is one of the tourist destinations of Hormozgan Province in Southern Iran.

Sources 

Mosques in Iran
Mosque buildings with domes
National works of Iran